Tatarska Góra TV Tower is an 86-meter steel tower, situated at the Tartar Mound in the area of Przemyśl, Poland that was built in the 1930s.

Transmitted programmes

FM radio

Digital television MPEG-4

See also

 List of masts

External links

References 

Radio masts and towers in Poland
Przemyśl County
1930s establishments in Poland